Encounters of the Spooky Kind II (Chinese: 鬼咬鬼) is a 1990 Hong Kong martial arts comedy horror film directed by Ricky Lau. It was produced by and stars Sammo Hung, who also choreographed the combat. The film was produced by Hung's production company, Bojon Films Company Ltd. It was released as Spooky Encounters 2 in the US. It is sometimes listed as aka Close Encounters of the Spooky Kind 2 . Despite the title, the film is not a sequel to Encounters of the Spooky Kind. The film's Chinese title literally translates as "Ghost Bites Ghost".

Plot
Tea-house worker and martial-arts student "Abao" is to married to his boss's daughter, "Little Chu" and Abao fights to protect her from the advances of the wealthy "Master Shi". The two men's romantic rivalry escalates into a full-scale supernatural battle after Shi enlists the help of a wicked sorcerer, and Abao encounters a benevolent female ghost.

Cast
 Sammo Hung as Abao
 Lam Ching-ying as Master Kau - Uncle Kau to friends
 Mang Hoi  as Little Hoi (as Meng Hoi)
 Teddy Yip as Chu
 Wong Man-kwan as Hung (Female Ghost)
 Huang Ha as The Priest
 Tam Sin-hung as Hsiao-hung's Mother
 Collin Chou as Snakeman
 Cheung Kwok-keung as Customer with kid
 Mimi Kung as Little Chu - Bo's Fiancé

Box office
Encounters of the Spooky Kind II grossed HK$13,581,385 at the Hong Kong box office.

Home Media

VHS

DVD

References

External links 
 Encounters of the Spooky Kind II at Hong Kong Movie Database
 Encounters of the Spooky Kind II at Hong Kong Cinemagic
 

1990 films
1990 martial arts films
1990s comedy horror films
1990 action comedy films
Hong Kong action comedy films
Hong Kong martial arts comedy films
Hong Kong supernatural horror films
Jiangshi films
Martial arts horror films
1990s Cantonese-language films
1990s Hong Kong films